Liang Fuliang (born 12 January 1983) is a Chinese gymnast. Liang was part of the Chinese team that won the gold medal in the team event at the 2006 World Artistic Gymnastics Championships and the 2006 Asian Games.

References

External links
 

1983 births
Living people
Chinese male artistic gymnasts
Medalists at the World Artistic Gymnastics Championships
Place of birth missing (living people)
Gymnasts from Guangdong
Asian Games medalists in gymnastics
Gymnasts at the 2002 Asian Games
Gymnasts at the 2006 Asian Games
Asian Games gold medalists for China
Asian Games silver medalists for China
Medalists at the 2002 Asian Games
Medalists at the 2006 Asian Games
Universiade medalists in gymnastics
Universiade silver medalists for China
Medalists at the 2005 Summer Universiade
21st-century Chinese people